Vladimir Nikolayevich Nikitin (July 17, 1848 – May 21, 1922) was an Imperial Russian corps and army commander. He fought in the war against the Ottoman Empire and the Empire of Japan.

Awards
Russo-Turkish War:
Order of Saint George, 4th degree
Order of Saint Vladimir, 4th class
Order of Saint Anna, 4th class
Order of Saint Stanislaus (House of Romanov), 2nd class
Gold Sword for Bravery
Russo-Japanese War:
Order of Saint George, 3rd degree
Order of Saint Anna, 1st class
Order of Saint Vladimir, 2nd class
Order of the White Eagle (Russian Empire)

Bibliography
   (ACT);  (Астрель)

Sources
 Биография Никитина В. Н. на сайте «Хронос»
 

1848 births
1922 deaths
Russian military personnel of the Russo-Turkish War (1877–1878)
Russian military personnel of the Russo-Japanese War
Russian military personnel of World War I
Recipients of the Order of St. Vladimir, 4th class
Recipients of the Order of St. Anna, 4th class
Recipients of the Order of Saint Stanislaus (Russian), 2nd class
Recipients of the Gold Sword for Bravery
Recipients of the Order of St. George of the Third Degree
Recipients of the Order of St. Anna, 1st class
Recipients of the Order of St. Vladimir, 2nd class
Recipients of the Order of the White Eagle (Russia)